Geng Xiaoling  (born 2 February 1984) is a retired professional wushu taolu athlete who represented Hong Kong. She is one of the most renowned taolu athletes of all time, having been a five-time world champion and a gold medallist at the Asian Games and the East Asian Games.

Career 
Geng began training wushu at the age of ten and later was accepted into the Shandong Wushu Team. She competed at the 2005 National Games of China but was unsuccessful in winning any medals. In 2006, she was approached by Yu Liguang, coach of the Hong Kong Wushu Team, and was invited to start representing Hong Kong in wushu competitions.

Geng's international debut was at the 2007 World Wushu Championships in Beijing where she won a silver medal in daoshu and a bronze medal in changquan. This qualified her for the 2008 Beijing Wushu Tournament where she won the gold medal in the daoshu and gunshu combined event. A year later, she appeared at the 2009 East Asian Games and won in the same combined event. During the 2009 World Wushu Championships, she won her first gold medal (in daoshu) at the WWC, and also won a silver medal in gunshu. Geng's next major appearance was at the 2010 World Combat Games where she won a silver medal in changquan. A few months later, she was able to win the gold medal in the changquan event at the 2010 Asian Games. A year later, she was a triple medallist at the 2011 World Wushu Championships and was the world champion in gunshu. At the 2013 World Wushu Championships, she was a triple medallist once again and was the world champion in daoshu for the second time.

Half a month before the 2013 East Asian Games, Geng suffered a sudden knee injury and was told that she should not compete. She persisted, and was able to win the gold medal in the daoshu and gunshu combined event. A year later at the 2014 Asian Games, her four teammates forfeited from competition due to injuries and Geng felt pressured to win Hong Kong's only medal in the wushu event and to also defend her title from 2010. Despite a successful performance, she only won the silver medal in changquan. She made up this loss with an impressive showing at the 2015 World Wushu Championships where she won two gold medals, becoming world champion in changquan and gunshu. After this competition, Geng announced her formal retirement from competition and became an assistant coach for the Hong Kong Wushu Team.

Shortly before the 2018 Asian Games, three wushu athletes who were to represent Hong Kong were deemed ineligible to compete because they did not fulfil the residency requirement to represent Hong Kong at an international sporting competition. At the age of 34, Geng was called out of retirement to compete in the women's changquan event. Although she performed successfully, Geng lost a podium spot due to a 0.1 deduction. Despite not placing, she stated she was satisfied with her performance, and declared her retirement once again to resume coaching the Hong Kong Wushu Team.

Honours 
Awards from the Hong Kong SAR Government

 Medal of Honour: 2011

Hong Kong Sports Stars Awards

 Outstanding Athlete of Hong Kong: 2010, 2011, 2012, 2013, 2015
Awards from the Junior Chamber International Hong Kong

 : 2017

See also 

 List of Asian Games medalists in wushu

References

External links 
 Athlete profile at the 2018 Asian Games
Geng Xiaoling on Sina Weibo

1984 births
Living people
Hong Kong wushu practitioners
Asian Games gold medalists for Hong Kong
Asian Games silver medalists for Hong Kong
Competitors at the 2008 Beijing Wushu Tournament
Wushu practitioners at the 2010 Asian Games
Wushu practitioners at the 2014 Asian Games
Wushu practitioners at the 2018 Asian Games
Medalists at the 2010 Asian Games
Medalists at the 2014 Asian Games
Asian Games medalists in wushu